Jaroslava "Jarka" Lutz (née Krčálová is a Czechoslovak-French retired slalom canoeist who competed in the late 1960s. She won a gold medal in the mixed C-2 event at the 1967 ICF Canoe Slalom World Championships in Lipno nad Vltavou representing Czechoslovakia. She married French slalom canoeist Claude Lutz in December 1967 and continued competing with him in C-2 Mixed (male/female double canoe). Together they won two silver medals at the 1969 ICF Canoe Slalom World Championships in Bourg St.-Maurice (one individual and one in the team event).

References

Czech female canoeists
Czechoslovak female canoeists
French female canoeists
Possibly living people
Year of birth missing (living people)
Medalists at the ICF Canoe Slalom World Championships
20th-century French women